Monika Zgustová (22 March 1957, Prague) is a Czech writer and translator. She is a key figure in the introduction of Czech literature in Spain, translating into Spanish and Catalan.

Biography
She studied comparative literature at the University of Illinois in the 1970s. Since the 1980s, she has lived in Barcelona.

She is the translator of many major works of Czech fiction; she has translated more than fifty books from Czech and Russian into Spanish and Catalan, including works by Bohumil Hrabal, Jaroslav Hašek, Václav Havel, Jaroslav Seifert, Milan Kundera, Fyodor Dostoyevsky, Isaac Babel, Anna Akhmatova and Marina Tsvetaeva.
She regularly writes articles and editorials for El País (Spain), La Vanguardia (Spain), The Nation (USA), and Lidové Noviny (Czech Republic).

Zgustova's most acclaimed books are Dressed for a Dance in the Snow (2020), named a Notable Translated Book of the Year by World Literature Today, an account of women's resilience in Stalin's forced labor camps, The Silent Woman (2005), a novel which encompasses three generations of Czechs, Russians and Americans, and Roses from Stalin (2015), a novel based on Stalin's daughter Svetlana's life story.

Zgustova has been praised internationally since 2005 and her works have been translated into ten languages. She has received more than 10 awards and honors.

Works

Non-Fiction 
 Beautiful Stranger. Prague and its uprooted culture (2021)
 Dressed for a Dance in the Snow  (2020, Other Press) Original Spanish version Vestidas para un baile en la nieve (2017)
 The Intruder. An Intimate Portrait of Gala Dalí (2018)
 The Bitter Fruit of the Garden of Delights: Life and Work of Bohumil Hrabal (2014)

Fiction 
 We Saw Each Other Better in the Darkness (2022) Original Spanish title Nos veíamos mejor en la oscuridad (2022)
 A Revolver for Going out at Night with (2019)
 Roses from Stalin (2015)
 Valya's Night (2013)
 The Silent Woman (2013, Feminist Press) Original Czech title Tichá žena
 Fresh Mint with Lemon (2013, Open Road) (Original Czech version Peppermint Frappé, 2002)
 Goya's Glass (2012, Feminist Press)
 Absent Moon (2010)
 Winter Garden (2009)
 The Good Soldier Švejk (a play; 2005)

Awards and honors

 Finalist for The Great Literary Thursday Award (Velký knižní čtvrtek) for We Saw Each Other Better in the Darkness (Potmě jsme se viděli lépe), Czech Republic 2022
 Notable Translated Book of the Year by World Literature Today for Dressed for a Dance in the Snow, 2020
 Booksellers recommend (Los libreros recomiendan) for A Revolver For Going Out At Night With, Spain 2019
 Cálamo award, Book of the Year for Dressed for a Dance in the Snow (Vestidas para un baile en la nieve), Spain 2017
 Amat-Piniella award, for Valya's Night, Spain 2014
 Angel Crespo award, for the translation of Jaroslav Hašek's Las aventuras del buen soldado Švejk, Spain 2010
 Mercè Rodoreda award for Absent Moon (Contes de la lluna absent), Spain 2009
 Finalist for Premio Nacional de la Crítica for The Silent Woman (La mujer silenciosa), Spain 2005
 Gratias Agit award, for her global work, Czech Republic 2004
 Ciutat de Barcelona award, for the translation of Jaroslav Hašek's Les aventures del bon soldat Švejk, Spain 1995
 European Award for Translation for Václav Havel's Letters to Olga, 1994

References

External links
Official website
Articles written by Monika Zgustova at EL PAÍS Newspaper
Monika Zgustova at The Nation Newspaper
Monika Zgustova at La Maleta de Portbou
Five Best: Monika Zgustova on women of the gulag - Wall Street Journal
In Celebration of Bookstores Reopening - Literary Hub

Living people
1957 births
Czech women writers